The Basilica of Our Lady of Licheń   is a Roman Catholic church located at the Shrine of Our Lady of Sorrows, Queen of Poland, in the village of Licheń Stary near Konin in the Greater Poland Voivodeship in Poland. It was designed by Barbara Bielecka and built between 1994 and 2004. The construction was funded by pilgrims' donations. With a tower measuring 141.5 meters in height, it is one of the tallest and largest churches in the world.


History
The history of the foundation of the church dates back to 1813, when Tomasz Kłossowski, a Polish soldier fighting under Napoleon near Leipzig, was seriously wounded. He invoked the Virgin Mary, begging her not to let him die in a foreign land. According to legend, she appeared to him wearing a golden crown, a dark red gown, with a golden mantle, and holding a white eagle in her right hand. She comforted the soldier and promised he would recover and return to Poland. Tomasz was instructed to have an image of her made, and to place the image in a public place so that "My people will pray before this image and shall draw many graces at My hands in the hardest times of trial."

With the nave 120 meters long and 77 meters wide, with a central dome 98 meters (321 feet) high, and with a tower 141.5 metres (464 feet) tall, it is Poland's largest church and one of the largest church buildings in the world. Also, it has one of the tallest domes in the world. The church is dedicated to Our Lady of Sorrows, Queen of Poland, whose icon, perhaps dating back to the 18th century, is displayed on the basilica's main altar. It is one of Poland's principal pilgrimage sites.

Between 2002 and 2007, Polish organbuilder Zych - on the base of the project made by Prof. Andrzej Chorosiński - built a 157-stop pipe organ (6 manuals and pedalboard). It is the largest organ in Poland, 4th in Europe and 13th around the world.

Pope John Paul II blessed the Basilica in 1999.
In 2007, parts of the Polish museum in Fawley Court were translocated to the shrine by the Marian Fathers.

Gallery

See also
Roman Catholic Marian churches
List of tallest domes
List of tallest churches

References

External links

 
__notoc__

The Most Holy Virgin Mary, Queen of Poland
Basilica churches in Poland
Shrines to the Virgin Mary
Roman Catholic churches completed in 2004
Konin County
Licheń
Church buildings with domes
21st-century Roman Catholic church buildings
21st-century churches in Poland